Bornos is a town and municipality located in the province of Cádiz, Spain.

Demographics

References

External links 

Bornos - Sistema de Información Multiterritorial de Andalucía

Municipalities of the Province of Cádiz